Bergen Airport normally refers to Bergen Airport, Flesland.

It may also refer to:
 Bergen Airport, Hjellestad, a former water aerodrome
 Bergen Airport, Sandviken, a water aerodrome
 Bergen Heliport, Grønneviksøren, a medical heliport
 Bergen Heliport, Nygårdstangen, a former medical heliport
 Bergen Heliport, University Hospital, a medical helipad at Haukeland University Hospital
 Flatøy Airport, a former military water aerodrome
 Herdla Airport, a former military airport